Impulse is the debut studio album by American progressive metalcore band Erra. It was released on November 30, 2011 through Tragic Hero Records and was produced by Brian Hood. It is their only album with founding bassist Adam Hicks.

Track listing

Personnel
Erra
 Garrison Lee – unclean vocals
 Jesse Cash – guitar, bass, clean vocals
 Alan Rigdon – guitar, bass, backing vocals
 Adam Hicks – bass
 Alex Ballew – drums

Additional personnel
 Brian Hood – production, engineering, mixing, mastering
 Alex Wade and Shawn Carrano – management
 Aaron Marsh – A&R, photography, layout, design

References

2011 debut albums
Erra (band) albums
Tragic Hero Records albums